Fjalar Þorgeirsson (born 18 January 1977) is an Icelandic football coach and former player who played the goalkeeper position. He played 5 games for the Iceland national football team during his career. He played 227 matches in the Icelandic top-tier Úrvalsdeild karla.

Playing career
Fjalar started his career with Þróttur before joining Fram in 2000. After two seasons with Fram, Fjalar returned to Þróttur where he played until their relegation in 2005.

From 2006 to 2011 he played for Fylkir. On 27 July 2009, he broke his hand during a game against Fram after a collision with an opponent. Despite the injury, he played the remaining 20 minutes of the game.

Prior to the 2012 season, Fjalar signed with KR. During the season, he was a reserve goalkeeper to Hannes Þór Halldórsson, only appeared in two matches. In October 2012, Fjalar signed with Valur. On 15 July 2013, he played his 200th match in the Úrvalsdeild karla.

In May 2015, Fjalar signed with Skautafélag Reykjavíkur where he would appear in one match in the 4. deild karla during the 2015 season.

Coaching career
Fjalar became a goalkeeper coach for Stjarnan in 2015. He later became an assistant manager for the team, a post he served until October 2019. In December the same year, he was hired as a goalkeeper coach for FH.

References

External links
 
 

1977 births
Living people
Fjalar Thorgeirsson
Fjalar Thorgeirsson
Fjalar Thorgeirsson
Fjalar Thorgeirsson
Association football goalkeepers